Matthew Joseph Virtue-Thick (born 2 May 1997) is an English professional footballer who plays for Lincoln City, on loan from Blackpool, as a midfielder. He has previously played for Liverpool and Notts County.

Career
Virtue joined Liverpool at under-11 level, having played with Chelsea until the age of 9. He moved on loan to Notts County in January 2018.

He was named captain of Liverpool's Under-23 team in October 2018. In January 2019, he signed for Blackpool. He scored his first professional goal against Accrington Stanley on 5 March 2019.

On 16 October 2020, Virtue signed a new two-year contract with Blackpool. In December 2020 he tested positive for COVID-19 and had to self-isolate, missing matches. In October 2021 he extended his contract for a further year.

He moved on loan to Lincoln City on 1 September 2022. He made his debut coming off the bench against Cambridge United on 3 September 2022. He scored his first goal for Lincoln City against Bristol Rovers in a 6–3 win on 17 September 2022.

Career statistics

References

1997 births
Living people
English footballers
Chelsea F.C. players
Liverpool F.C. players
Notts County F.C. players
Blackpool F.C. players
Lincoln City F.C. players
English Football League players
Association football midfielders
Footballers from Surrey